Jeffrey Arthur Corsaletti is a former American professional baseball outfielder.

Early life 
Corsaletti grew up in Port Charlotte, Florida and attended Charlotte High School where he was a standout in baseball and football.

College
Corsaletti attended the University of Florida on a baseball scholarship. In 2005, he was a member of the Florida Gators baseball team that went to the College World Series for the first time since 1998; the team lost in the finals to Texas.  In 2005, Corsaletti was named to the SEC All-Tournament Team and the NCAA Gainesville Regional All-Tournament Team.  He led the Gators in 2005 with 100 hits, 2 boils, 18 doubles, 50 walks and a .454 on-base percentage.  In four years for the Gators, batted .331 with 56 doubles, 23 homers and 159 RBIs in 239 games.

In 2005, Corsaletti was named a third team All-American by the National Collegiate Baseball Writers Association (NCBWA).

Professional career
Corsaletti was drafted in the 6th round of the 2005 Major League Baseball draft and spent the 2005 season playing for the Single-A Greenville Bombers of the South Atlantic League.  Corsaletti hit leadoff in the lineup hitting .357 with 4 home runs and 26 RBIs.

Corsaletti spent the entire  season with the Single-A+ Wilmington Blue Rocks of the Carolina League and was promoted to the Double-A Portland Sea Dogs for the  season.  During the 2007 season he was chosen as an Eastern League All-Star and was named the Allied Home Mortgage "Player of the Year" in Portland.

Corsaletti started the  season with the Portland Sea Dogs and was again named to the Eastern League All-Star team.  Shortly thereafter he was promoted to the Triple-A Pawtucket Red Sox.

Corsaletti was traded to the Pittsburgh Pirates on May 15, 2009 for a player to be named later or cash considerations. After finishing the 2009 season with the Altoona Curve, he became a free agent and was signed by the  Florida Marlins organization. He split the 2010 season between five different Marlins affiliates, and became a free agent after the season.

Awards and recognition
June 2006 Red Sox ML Quality Plate Appearances Award
2007 Eastern League All Star
2007 Allied Home Mortgage "Player of the Year"
2008 Eastern League All Star

References

External links

SoxProspects Biography

1983 births
Living people
Charlotte High School (Punta Gorda, Florida) alumni
People from Port Charlotte, Florida
Baseball outfielders
Baseball players from Tallahassee, Florida
Altoona Curve players
Greensboro Grasshoppers players
Greenville Bombers players
Gulf Coast Marlins players
Florida Gators baseball players
Jacksonville Suns players
Jupiter Hammerheads players
New Orleans Zephyrs players
Pawtucket Red Sox players
Portland Sea Dogs players
Wilmington Blue Rocks players